CB10 might refer to:

 CB postcode area, in the United Kingdom
 Bronx Community Board 10, in New York City
 Brooklyn Community Board 10, in New York City
 Manhattan Community Board 10, in New York City
 Queens Community Board 10, in New York City